William George Uhl Sr. (January 7, 1933 - December 23, 2022)   was a retired American basketball player.  The  center was a consensus second team All-American player at the University of Dayton in 1956.

Uhl starred at McClain High School in Greenfield, Ohio, and graduated in 1951. He accepted a scholarship offer to Ohio State University, and followed in the footsteps of Greenfield's Don Grate. Uhl, however experienced a difficult adjustment in Columbus and dropped out of Ohio State shortly after the beginning of his second semester.

Uhl transferred and then played three varsity seasons at Dayton, from 1953–56. He was the school's first seven-footer and earned the nickname "The Greenfield Goliath." For his career, Uhl averaged 18.5 points and 14.6 rebounds per game. He finished with 1,627 total points in his collegiate days.

The Flyers also had great team success during Uhl's tenure, going 75-15 over his three years at the school, with three NIT appearances—including trips to the championship game in both 1955 and 1956. The Flyers also achieved the highest national ranking in their history during the 1955–56 season, and ranked #2 behind undefeated defending national champion San Francisco.

Following the completion of his collegiate career, Uhl was drafted by the Rochester Royals in the 1956 NBA draft. But instead, he opted to enter the insurance business. He opened a successful agency in the south Dayton suburbs and enjoyed a successful business career until his retirement. Uhl's son, Bill Uhl, Jr., who also played basketball at Dayton, continues to operate the insurance agency his father founded.

Uhl was inducted into the University of Dayton Athletic Hall of Fame in 1968 and was named to the school's All-Century team during the 2003–04 season. In 2013, he was inducted into the Ohio Basketball Hall of Fame.

Uhl married his wife, Cynthia, in 1957 and they resided for many years in Washington Township near Dayton. The Uhls had five children and 11 grandchildren who reside in various midwestern locales.

References

External links
Ohio basketball Hall of Fame profile

1933 births
Living people
All-American college men's basketball players
American men's basketball players
Basketball players from Ohio
Centers (basketball)
Dayton Flyers men's basketball players
People from Greenfield, Ohio
Rochester Royals draft picks